The FLATZ Museum is a contemporary art museum in Dornbirn, Vorarlberg (Austria).

The museum dates back to an oeuvre donation to the city of Dornbirn from the action artist FLATZ (Wolfgang Flatz, *1952, Dornbirn). The opening took place in 2009 by the former "documenta" director Jan Hoet.

It shows changing exhibitions designed by international guest curators with a focus on photographic art, organises readings, lecture series, discussions and performances. The collection includes key works by Wolfgang Flatz from the period 1975 to 1999 and is supplemented by private loans.

Former special exhibitions

 2019: Spencer Tunick: "Nudes"
 2019: FLATZ: "FACES"
 2018: „Die Kamera ist grausam" – masterpieces by Model, Arbus, Goldin
 2018: Gisèle Freund: "Frida Kahlo & Diego Rivera"
 2017: Elfie Semotan: "Stillleben", Martin Parr: "Cakes Balls"
 2016: Eduard Stranadko "Shining" – photographs of Chernobyl

External links 

 Home page

References 

Local museums in Austria
Museums in Vorarlberg
History museums in Austria